Peter Lee Wild (born 20 July 1984) is an English football coach who is the manager of Barrow.

Early and personal life
Wild was born in Royton. He is a lifetime fan of Oldham Athletic, attending his first game at the age of six, on New Year's Day 1991. Prior to becoming a football coach, Wild worked various jobs, such as: a tree surgeon, an apprentice car mechanic and working in his parent's pubs.

Career
Wild played amateur football before taking up coaching at the age of 18. Wild's first job in coaching was with Oldham Council working in their sports department. Before he began coaching in Oldham's academy, Wild worked as a development officer at the Manchester FA. Wild also managed the England Amputee football team between 2012 and 2015.

After working for the club for 10 years, including as their interim academy manager, Wild was appointed as Oldham's caretaker manager on 27 December 2018 following the sacking of Frankie Bunn. He won his first two games in charge. On 6 January 2019 he led the club to a "famous" FA Cup victory against Premier League club Fulham, his third straight win as manager. Following the match he said that he was considering stepping down as caretaker manager, stating that "I've been an academy manager two minutes [...] the fairytale will come to an end at some point, reality will strike. And you've got to be prepared for that. I've got a family to support and a mortgage to pay". After eight matches in charge (four wins, three losses, and one draw) he was replaced as Oldham manager by Paul Scholes on 11 February 2019. Wild's final game in charge was a 3–0 away victory at Crawley Town two days previously.

In March 2019, following the resignation of Scholes, Wild returned as caretaker manager.  On 22 March 2019, he was appointed the club's permanent manager, on a contract until the end of the season. He left the club in May 2019, for "personal reasons".

On 24 July 2019, Wild was appointed the manager of National League side FC Halifax Town. In November 2019 he was linked with the vacant Grimsby Town manager's job, but he denied receiving an approach from them. In February 2022 he was linked with the vacant job at Bradford City, and in May 2022 with the job at Barrow.

On 26 May 2022, Wild resigned from Halifax to pursue a new opportunity. The following day he was announced as the new manager of League Two club Barrow.

Managerial statistics

References

1984 births
Living people
People from Royton
English football managers
Oldham Athletic A.F.C. non-playing staff
Oldham Athletic A.F.C. managers
FC Halifax Town managers
Barrow A.F.C. managers
English Football League managers
National League (English football) managers
Association football coaches